Walid Nassi Ouled Bentle (born 15 July 2000) is a French professional footballer who plays as a winger for Dijon.

Club career
Nassi is a youth product of Blanc-Mesnil SF since the age of 5, before moving to the Régional 2 club Châteaudun in the French 7th division in 2018. The following season, he moved up to the Régional 1 with Saint-Georges-sur-Eure where he was the top scorer in a season shortened by the COVID-19 pandemic. He moved to the reserves of Stade Briochin for the 2020–21 season, but had limited play in the first season due to the pandemic. The following season, he broke into their first team after a COVID-19 outbreak in the squad forced them to play him. On 21 June 2022, he transferred to Dijon in the Ligue 2 signing a 3-year contract. He made his senior and professional debut with Dijon in a 3–1 Ligue 2 win over Saint-Étienne on 30 July 2022.

Personal life
Born in France, Nassi is of Moroccan descent.

References

External links
 
 FDB Profile
 FCSGE 1 profile

2000 births
Living people
People from Le Blanc-Mesnil
French footballers
French sportspeople of Moroccan descent
Association football wingers
Stade Briochin players
Dijon FCO players
Ligue 2 players
Championnat National players
Championnat National 3 players